The Mainstream Sellout Tour was a concert tour by American musician Machine Gun Kelly. The tour supported his sixth studio album Mainstream Sellout (2022), and visited North America and Europe. The tour began on June 8, 2022 at the newly-built Moody Center in Austin, Texas, and concluded on October 12, 2022 at the AFAS Live in Amsterdam. The tour was promoted by Live Nation Entertainment.

The tour featured eight different opening acts, varying by venue, some of which being frequent collaborators of Machine Gun Kelly's. The opening acts include Blackbear, Iann Dior, Avril Lavigne, Pvris, Trippie Redd, Willow, 44phantom, and Travis Barker of Blink-182. Barker is the primary producer of Mainstream Sellout, as well as Machine Gun Kelly's fifth studio album, Tickets to My Downfall (2020).

Set list 
This set list is from the concert on June 8, 2022, in Austin, Texas. It is not intended to represent all shows from the tour.

 "Born with Horns"
 "God Save Me"
 "Maybe"
 "Mainstream Sellout"
 "Drunk Face"
 "Concert for Aliens"
 "All I Know"
 "Ay!"
 "Jawbreaker"
 "More Than Life"
 "Die in California"
 "Till I Die"
 "Floor 13"
 "Papercuts"
 "Title Track"
 "Kiss Kiss"
 "Bloody Valentine"
 "Roll the Windows Up"
 "El Diablo"
 "WWIII"
 "WW4"
 "Emo Girl"
 "5150"
 "Nothing Inside" 
 "Sick and Tired" 
 "Fake Love Don't Last" 
 "Lonely"
 "I Think I'm Okay"
 "Forget Me Too"
 "Make Up Sex" 
 "My Ex's Best Friend" 
 "Sid & Nancy"
 "Twin Flame"

Shows

Notes

References

2022 concert tours
Concert tours of North America
Concert tours of Europe